The R.T. Scherck House is a historic house in Brookhaven, Mississippi. It was designed in the Queen Anne style, and built in 1896 for Richard Theodore Scherck. The latter was the son of Abraham Scherck, an immigrant from Germany. He began his career by working for his father, and he later opened the Inez Hotel in Brookhaven. The house has been listed on the National Register of Historic Places since April 14, 1992.

References

1896 establishments in Mississippi
Houses completed in 1896
Queen Anne architecture in Mississippi
National Register of Historic Places in Lincoln County, Mississippi